The Solomon Bublick Award (Solomon Bublick Public Service Award or Solomon Bublick Prize) is an award made by the Hebrew University of Jerusalem to a person who has made an important contribution to the advancement and development of the State of Israel. The first award was made in 1949.

History
Solomon Bublick (died 1945) was an American who left the sum of $37,000 to establish the award to be granted every two years. It is one of the two prestigious awards made by the University.  The prize is given for a lifetime dedicated to the well-being of the Jewish people and the State of Israel, alternatively to an Israeli and to a personality from abroad.

In 1950, the award included $1500.
In 1960, the award included a sterling silver plaque and $1000.

Recipients
 2018 Professor Menachem Magidor former president and Professor Emeritus of mathematics at The Hebrew University
 2016 Professor Hanoch Gutfreund alumnus and former president and Professor Emeritus of theoretical physics of The Hebrew University
 2015 Israeli President and Prime Minister Shimon Peres
 2012 Amal Elsana Alh'jooj, in recognition of her long-standing activism on behalf of the Bedouin community in Israel
 2013 Prof. Ruth Gavison
 2011 Prof. Ilan Chet
 2010 Avi Naor
 2009 Professor Shlomo Avineri, a leading Israeli social scientist, in recognition of his contribution to political science and the politics of the State of Israel
 2003 Uzia Galil 
 1999 Haim Zadok for his manifold contributions to the Israeli legal System and the rule of law
 1998 Prof. Aryeh Dvoretzky 
 1995 Saul Patai, for editing The Chemistry of Functional Groups
 1992 Prof. Meir Kister
 1991 Dr. David S. Sala
 1981 Marie Syrkin, for work on behalf of the Jewish people
 1980 Isador Magid
 1979 Rabbi Alexander Schindler, for commitment to the role of education in Jewish life
 1976 Philip S. Bernstein
 1974 Michael Sacher, British Zionist leader
 1972 Prof. Robert Bachi, professor of statistics and demography
 1967 Judge Edward S. Silver
 1966 Saul Adler, awarded posthumously, although informed on the day of his death
 1966 Robert Szold
 1964 Prof Haim Ernst Wertheimer, Professor of Biochemistry, for outstanding scientific work in the field of human biochemistry
 1960 William Rosenwald, national chairman of the United Jewish Appeal
 1957 Senator Herbert H. Lehman
 1956 Dr. Bernhard Zondek, Professor of Gynaecology and Obstretics
 1956 Dr. Nahum Goldmann
 1953 President Harry S. Truman
 1950 Prof. Eliezer Sukenik, Israel archaeologist, for his work on ancient scrolls believed to be the original manuscript of the Book of Isaiah
 1949 David Ben-Gurion

References

Israeli culture
Israeli awards
Hebrew University of Jerusalem